The freguesias (civil parishes) of Portugal are listed in by municipality according to the following format:
 concelho
 freguesias

Vagos
Calvão
Covão do Lobo
Fonte de Angeão
Gafanha da Boa Hora
Ouca
Ponte de Vagos
Santa Catarina
Santo André de Vagos
Santo António de Vagos
Sosa
Vagos

Vale de Cambra
Arões
Cepelos
Codal
Junqueira
Macieira de Cambra
Roge
São Pedro de Castelões
Vila Chã
Vila Cova de Perrinho

Valença
Arão
Boivão
Cerdal
Cristelo Covo
Fontoura
Friestas
Gandra
Ganfei
Gondomil
Sanfins
São Julião
São Pedro da Torre
Silva
Taião
Valença
Verdoejo

Valongo
Alfena
Campo
Ermesinde
Sobrado
Valongo

Valpaços
Água Revés e Crasto
Algeriz
Alvarelhos
Barreiros
Bouçoães
Canaveses
Carrezedo de Montenegro
Curros
Ervões
Fiães
Fornos do Pinhal
Friões
Lebução
Nozelos
Padrela e Tazem
Possacos
Rio Torto
Sanfins
Santa Maria de Emeres
Santa Valha
Santiago da Ribeira de Alhariz
São João da Corveira
São Pedro de Veiga de Lila
Serapicos
Sonim
Tinhela
Vales
Valpaços
Vassal
Veiga de Lila
Vilarandelo

Velas (Azores)
Manadas
Norte Grande
Rosais
Santo Amaro
Urzelina
Velas

Vendas Novas
Landeira
Vendas Novas

Viana do Alentejo
Aguiar
Alcáçovas
Viana do Alentejo

Viana do Castelo
Afife
Alvarães
Amonde
Anha
Areosa
Barroselas
Cardielos
Carreço
Carvoeiro
Castelo do Neiva
Chafé
Darque
Deão
Deocriste
Freixieiro de Soutelo
Geraz do Lima (Santa Leocádia)
Geraz do Lima (Santa Maria)
Lanheses
Mazarefes
Meadela
Meixedo
Montaria
Moreira de Geraz do Lima
Mujães
Neiva
Nogueira
Outeiro
Perre
Portela Susã
Portuzelo
Serreleis
Subportela
Torre
Viana do Castelo (Monserrate)
Viana do Castelo (Santa Maria Maior)
Vila de Punhe
Vila Franca
Vila Fria
Vila Mou
Vilar de Murteda

Vidigueira
Pedrógão
Selmes
Vidigueira
Vila de Frades

Vieira do Minho
Anissó
Anjos
Campos
Caniçada
Cantelães
Cova
Eira Vedra
Guilhofrei
Louredo
Mosteiro
Parada do Bouro
Pinheiro
Rossas
Ruivães
Salamonde
Soengas
Soutelo
Tabuaças
Ventosa
Vieira do Minho
Vilar do Chão

Vila da Praia da Vitoria
Agualva
Biscoitos
Cabo da Praia
Fonte do Bastardo
Fontinhas
Lajes
Porto Martins
Praia da Vitória (Santa Cruz)
Quatro Ribeiras
São Brás
Vila Nova

Vila de Rei
Fundada
São João do Peso
Vila de Rei

Vila do Bispo
Barão de São Miguel
Budens
Raposeira
Sagres
Vila do Bispo

Vila do Conde
Arcos
Árvore
Aveleda
Azurara
Bagunte
Canidelo
Fajozes
Ferreiró
Fornelo
Gião
Guilhabreu
Junqueira
Labruge
Macieira da Maia
Malta
Mindelo
Modivas
Mosteiró
Outeiro Maior
Parada
Retorta
Rio Mau
Tougues
Touguinha
Touguinhó
Vairão
Vila Chã
Vila do Conde
Vilar
Vilar de Pinheiro

Vila do Porto (Azores)
Almagreira
Santa Bárbara
Santo Espírito
São Pedro
Vila do Porto

Vila Flor
Assares
Benlhevai
Candoso
Carvalho de Egas
Freixiel
Lodões
Mourão
Nabo
Roios
Samões
Sampaio
Santa Comba de Vilariça
Seixo de Manhoses
Trindade
Val de Torno
Vale Frechoso
Vila Flor
Vilarinho das Azenhas
Vilas Boas

Vila Franca de Xira
Alhandra (Portugal)
Alverca do Ribatejo
Cachoeiras
Calhandriz
Castanheira do Ribatejo
Forte da Casa
Póvoa de Santa Iria
São João dos Montes
Sobralinho
Vialonga
Vila Franca de Xira

Vila Franca do Campo (Azores)
Água de Alto
Ponta Garça
Ribeira das Tainhas
Ribeira Seca
São Miguel
São Pedro

Vila Nova da Barquinha
Atalaia
Moita do Norte
Praia do Ribatejo
Tancos
Vila Nova da Barquinha

Vila Nova de Cerveira
Campos
Candemil
Cornes
Covas
Gondar
Gondarém
Loivo
Lovelhe
Mentrestido
Nogueira
Reboreda
Sapardos
Sopo
Vila Meã
Vila Nova de Cerveira

Vila Nova de Famalicão
Abade de Vermoim
Antas
Arnoso (Santa Eulália)
Arnoso (Santa Maria)
Avidos
Bairro
Bente
Brufe
Cabeçudos
Calendário
Carreira
Castelões
Cavalões
Cruz
Delães
Esmeriz
Fradelos
Gavião
Gondifelos
Jesufrei
Joane
Lagoa
Landim
Lemenhe
Louro
Lousado
Mogege
Mouquim
Nine
Novais
Oliveira (Santa Maria)
Oliveira (São Mateus)
Outiz
Pedome
Portela
Pousada de Saramagos
Requião
Riba de Ave
Ribeirão
Ruivães
Seide (São Miguel)
Seide (São Paio)
Sezures
Telhado
Vale (São Cosme)
Vale (São Martinho)
Vermoim
Vila Nova de Famalicão
Vilarinho das Cambas

Vila Nova de Foz Côa
Almendra
Castelo Melhor
Cedovim
Chãs
Custóias
Freixo de Numão
Horta
Mós
Murça
Muxagata
Numão
Santa Comba
Santo Amaro
Sebadelhe
Seixas
Touça
Vila Nova de Foz Côa

Vila Nova de Gaia
Arcozelo
Avintes
Canelas
Canidelo
Crestuma
Grijó
Gulpilhares
Lever
Madalena
Mafamude
Olival
Oliveira do Douro
Pedroso
Perozinho
Sandim
São Félix da Marinha
São Pedro da Afurada
Seixezelo
Sermonde
Serzedo
Valadares
Vila Nova de Gaia (Santa Marinha)
Vilar de Andorinho
Vilar do Paraíso

Vila Nova de Paiva
Alhais
Fráguas
Pendilhe
Queiriga
Touro
Vila Cova à Coelheira
Vila Nova de Paiva

Vila Nova de Poiares
Arrifana
Lavegadas
Poiares (Santo André)
São Miguel de Poiares

Vila Pouca de Aguiar
Afonsim
Alfarela de Jales
Bornes de Aguiar
Bragado
Capeludos
Gouvães da Serra
Parada de Monteiros
Pensalvos
Sabroso de Aguiar
Santa Marta da Montanha
Soutelo de Aguiar
Telões
Tresminas
Valoura
Vila Pouca de Aguiar
Vreia de Bornes
Vreia de Jales

Vila Real
Abaças
Adoufe
Andrães
Arroios
Borbela
Campeã
Constantim
Ermida
Folhadela
Guiães
Justes
Lamares
Lamas de Olo

Mateus
Mondrões
Mouçós
Nogueira
Parada de Cunhos
Pena
Quintã
São Tomé do Castelo
Torgueda
Vale de Nogueiras
Vila Cova
Vila Marim
Vila Real (Nossa Senhora da Conceição)
Vila Real (São Dinis)
Vila Real (São Pedro)
Vilarinho de Samardã

Vila Real de Santo António
Monte Gordo
Vila Nova de Cacela
Vila Real de Santo António

Vila Velha de Ródão
Fratel
Perais
Sarnadas de Ródão
Vila Velha de Ródão

Vila Verde
Aboim da Nóbrega
Arcozelo
Atães
Atiães
Azões
Barbudo
Barros
Cabanelas
Carreiras (Santiago)
Carreiras (São Miguel)
Cervães
Codeceda
Coucieiro
Covas
Dossãos
Duas Igrejas
Escariz (São Mamede)
Escariz (São Martinho)
Esqueiros
Freiriz
Geme
Goães
Godinhaços
Gomide
Gondiães
Gondomar
Laje
Lanhas
Loureira
Marrancos
Mós
Moure
Nevogilde
Oleiros
Oriz (Santa Marinha)
Oriz (São Miguel)
Parada de Gatim
Passó
Pedregais
Penascais
Pico
Pico de Regalados
Ponte
Portela das Cabras
Prado (São Miguel)
Rio Mau
Sabariz
Sande
Soutelo
Travassós
Turiz
Valbom (São Martinho)
Valbom (São Pedro)
Valdreu
Valões
Vila de Prado
Vila Verde
Vilarinho

Vila Viçosa
Bencatel
Ciladas
Pardais
Vila Viçosa (Conceição)
Vila Viçosa (São Bartolomeu)

Vimioso
Algoso
Angueira
Argozelo
Avelanoso
Caçarelhos
Campo de Víboras
Carção
Matela
Pinelo
Santulhão
Uva
Vale de Frades
Vilar Seco
Vimioso

Vinhais
Agrochão
Alvaredos
Candedo
Celas
Curopos
Edral
Edrosa
Ervedosa
Fresulfe
Mofreita
Moimenta
Montouto
Nunes
Ousilhão
Paçó
Penhas Juntas
Pinheiro Novo
Quirás
Rebordelo
Santa Cruz
Santalha
São Jomil
Sobreiro de Baixo
Soeira
Travanca
Tuizelo
Vale das Fontes
Vale de Janeiro
Vila Boa de Ousilhão
Vila Verde
Vilar de Lomba
Vilar de Ossos
Vilar de Peregrinos
Vilar Seco de Lomba
Vinhais

Viseu
Abraveses
Barreiros
Boa Aldeia
Bodiosa
Calde
Campo
Cavernães
Cepões
Cota
Couto de Baixo
Couto de Cima
Fail
Farminhão
Fragosela
Lordosa
Mundão
Orgens
Povolide
Ranhados
Repeses
Ribafeita
Rio de Loba
Santos Evos
São Cipriano
São João de Lourosa
São Pedro de France
São Salvador
Silgueiros
Torredeita
Vil de Souto
Vila Chã de Sá
Viseu (Coração de Jesus)
Viseu (Santa Maria de Viseu)
Viseu (São José)

Vizela
Caldas de Vizela (São João)
Caldas de Vizela (São Miguel)
Infias
Santa Eulália
Tagilde
Vizela (Santo Adrião)
Vizela (São Paio)

V